Odostomia virginica, common name the Virginia odostome,  is a species of sea snail, a marine gastropod mollusc in the family Pyramidellidae, the pyrams and their allies.

Description
The shell reaches a length of 2.7 mm.

Distribution
This species occurs in the Atlantic Ocean off Virginia, USA

References

External links
 To World Register of Marine Species
 To ITIS

virginica
Gastropods described in 1914